Xu Xiaoyan (born February 1947) is a retired lieutenant general (zhongjiang) in the People's Liberation Army. Previously he was Deputy Director of Science and Technology Committee of General Equipment Department of the People's Liberation Army. He was promoted to the rank of major general (shaojiang) in 1994 and lieutenant general (zhongjiang) in 2006.

Early life and education
Xu was born in Wutai County, Shanxi in February 1947, to Xu Xiangqian, a Communist military officer, and Huang Jie. He secondary studied at Beijing No. 4 High School. In 1972 he was accepted to Tsinghua University, majoring in the Department of Computer, where he graduated in 1975. Then he pursued advanced studies in Canada.

Career
He enlisted in the People's Liberation Army (PLA) in 1968. In December 1999 he became Head of Information Division of the People's Liberation Army General Staff Department, replacing . In July 2005 he was promoted to become Deputy Commander of Nanjing Military Region, but having held the position for only six months, and he was appointed Deputy Director of Science and Technology Committee of General Equipment Department of the People's Liberation Army.

He was a delegate to the 10th National People's Congress.

References

1947 births
Living people
People from Wutai County
Tsinghua University alumni
People's Liberation Army generals from Shanxi
Delegates to the 10th National People's Congress